Donja Toponica may refer to:
 Donja Toponica (Niš), a village in Niš, Serbia
 Donja Toponica (Prokuplje), a village in Prokuplje, Serbia